The 2007 FIVB Volleyball World League was the 18th edition of the annual men's international volleyball tournament, played by 16 countries from 25 May to 15 July 2007. The Final Round was held in Katowice, Poland.

Pools composition

Intercontinental round
The Final Round hosts Poland, the winners of each pool and a wild card chosen by the FIVB will qualify for the Final Round. If Poland are ranked first in Pool D, the team ranked second of Pool D will qualify for the Final Round.

Pool A

|}

|}

Pool B

|}

|}

Pool C

|}

|}

Pool D

|}

|}

Final round
Venue:  Spodek, Katowice, Poland
All times are Central European Summer Time (UTC+02:00).

Pool play

Pool E

|}

|}

Pool F

|}

|}

Final four

Semifinals

|}

3rd place match

|}

Final

|}

Final standing

Awards

Most Valuable Player
  Ricardo Garcia
Best Scorer
  Semyon Poltavskiy
Best Spiker
  Yury Berezhko
Best Blocker
  Gustavo Endres

Best Server
  Semyon Poltavskiy
Best Setter
  Paweł Zagumny
Best Libero
  Richard Lambourne

External links
Official website

FIVB Volleyball World League
FIVB World League
Volleyball
2007 in Polish sport